Newton Edward Miller (March 1, 1919 – December 13, 2012) was an American Republican Party politician who served in the New Jersey General Assembly, where he represented the 34th Legislative District.

Born in East Orange, New Jersey, Miller graduated from Clifton High School and earned undergraduate and graduate business degrees from Rutgers University.

Miller served as Mayor of Wayne, New Jersey from 1969 until 1982. He also served in the New Jersey General Assembly from 1982 until 1990.

Miller died in Venice, Florida on December 13, 2012.

Notes

1919 births
2012 deaths
Clifton High School (New Jersey) alumni
Mayors of places in New Jersey
People from Wayne, New Jersey
Politicians from East Orange, New Jersey
Politicians from Passaic County, New Jersey
Republican Party members of the New Jersey General Assembly
Rutgers University alumni